Gerald F. "Jerry" Newton (born September 15, 1937) is a Minnesota politician and member of the Minnesota State Senate. A member of the Minnesota Democratic–Farmer–Labor Party (DFL), he represents District 37, which includes portions of Anoka County in the northern Twin Cities metropolitan area. He is also a former grocery store owner, college professor, and career soldier.

Early life, education, and career
Newton graduated from Osseo High School in Osseo, Minnesota, then earned his B.A. in government from the University of Maryland in 1973. He received his MA in international relations in 1975 from Boston University, and studied political science at the doctoral level at the Catholic University of Leuven in Leuven, Belgium, and at the University of Minnesota in Minneapolis.

Newton served on active duty in the United States Army from 1955–1978, retiring as a sergeant major, having been deployed overseas for 18 of his 23 years of service, including  serving in Vietnam during the Vietnam War, and seven years in the Middle East. The Bronze Star and the Vietnam Cross of Gallantry with Palm are among his 23 awards of medals, battle stars, services ribbons, and decorations. He taught courses in political science at the Overseas Division of the University of Maryland from 1975-1976, University of Minnesota, 1979-1980, and Anoka Ramsey Community College, 2012-2014. He owned and managed the Blaine Dairy Store, Inc and Liberty Park Grocery from 1980-2001.

Minnesota State Senate
Newton was first elected to the Senate in 2016, succeeding the retiring Alice Johnson. He was a member of the following committees and commissions:

Energy and Utilities Finance and Policy
Ranking Minority Chair of Veterans and Military Affairs Finance and Policy
Chair, Legislative Permanent School Fund Commission 
Minnesota Amateur Sports Commission

Minnesota House of Representatives
Newton was first elected to the house in 2008, succeeding six-term Representative Kathy Tingelstad, who did not seek re-election. He was unseated by Republican Branden Petersen in the 2010 general election. He ran again and was elected in 2012.

During his first term, he was a member of the House K-12 Finance Committee, House K-12 Policy Committee, the House Transportation Fiance Committee and was Vice Chair of the Veterans Affairs Division of the House Agriculture, Rural Economies and Veterans Affairs Committee.

He was the Minnesota School Board Association 2009 Legislator of the Year for his leadership on hearings and legislation relating to special education. In 2009 Newton was also appointed by the Speaker of the House Paul Thissen to perform an in-depth study of veterans homes. In 2010 he was appointed by the Speaker of the House to Co-Chair the Coon Rapids Dam Legislative Commission to provide a barrier for invasive species of fish from gaining access to northeastern Minnesota waterways.

Personal life
Active in his local community and government, Newton was a member of the Coon Rapids City Council from 1994–2000, and served as acting mayor from 1999-2000. He was a member of the Anoka-Hennepin School District 11 School Board from 2000-2008. Through the years, he chaired the Anoka Human Rights Council, served on the Anoka County Affordable Housing Coalition, the Coon Rapids Economic Development Authority, the Crystal Housing and Re-Development Authority, the Energy, Environment and Natural Resources Committee of the National League of Cities (1995–2000), the Metropolitan Council Transportation Advisory Board (1996–2000), the Association of Metropolitan Municipalities, and the Northstar Corridor Development Authority.

Newton was a founding board member, president and emeritus director of Free2 Be, Inc. and is a former member of the Metro North Chamber of Commerce and the Coon Rapids Rotary, where he was honored as a Paul Harris Fellow. He is a life member of the VFW and is a member of Disabled American Veterans (DAV) and the Coon Rapids American Legion. Newton was best known locally for creating unique rail crossing quiet zones which set a national standard for enhanced rail crossing safety while silencing train horns. He initiated the local school district's first high school Science, Technology, Engineering and Math program at Blaine High School, the Baccalaureate program at Champlin Park High School and the Compass program to insure expelled students received continuing hands-on education.

References

External links

 Official MN House Page for Rep. Newton
 Campaign Web Page
 Project Votesmart - Rep. Jerry Newton Profile
 Session Weekly 1/23/2009: "No shortcut to service: Newton relishes opportunity to make tough decisions"

1937 births
Living people
University of Minnesota College of Liberal Arts alumni
People from Coon Rapids, Minnesota
Democratic Party members of the Minnesota House of Representatives
Officers of the Order of Merit of the Grand Duchy of Luxembourg
21st-century American politicians